GRINL1A complex locus protein 1 is a protein that in humans is encoded by the GRINL1A gene.

This gene (GRINL1A) is part of a complex transcript unit that includes the gene for GRINL1A combined protein (Gcom1). Transcription of this gene occurs at a downstream promoter, with at least three different alternatively spliced variants, grouped together as Gdown for GRINL1A downstream transcripts. The Gcom1 gene uses an upstream promoter for transcription and also has multiple alternatively spliced variants.

See also
 NMDA receptor

References

Further reading

External links 
 

Ionotropic glutamate receptors